Blu Tack is a reusable putty-like pressure-sensitive adhesive produced by Bostik, commonly used to attach lightweight objects (such as posters or sheets of paper) to walls, doors or other dry surfaces. Traditionally blue, it is also available in other colours. Generic versions of the product are also available from other manufacturers. The spelling now used is without a hyphen.

The composition is described as a synthetic rubber compound without hazardous properties under normal conditions. It can be swallowed without harm and is not carcinogenic. It is non-soluble and is denser than water. The material is not flammable, but emits carbon dioxide and carbon monoxide when exposed to fire or high temperatures.

As of 2015, Bostik was manufacturing around 100 tonnes of Blu Tack weekly at its Leicester factory.

History 

While the inventor of the commercially released Bostik product is unknown, a precursor product to Blu Tack was created by a sealant developer around 1970, as an accidental by-product of an attempt to develop a new sealant using chalk powder, rubber and oil.  Originally Blu Tack was white, but consumer research showed fears that children may mistake it for chewing gum, so a blue colouring was added.

In the United Kingdom in March 2008, 20,000 numbered packs of pink Blu Tack were made available, to help raise money for Breast Cancer Campaign, with 10 pence from each pack going to the charity. The formulation was slightly altered to retain complete consistency with its blue counterpart. Since then, many coloured variations have been made, including red and white, yellow, and a green Halloween pack.

Similar products 
Similar products of various colours are made by many manufacturers, including Faber-Castell's "Tack-it", Henkel's "Fun-Tak", UHU's "Poster Putty" and "Sticky Tack", UFO's "Dough Tack", "Gummy Sticker" Pritt's "Sticky Stuff", Bostik's "Prestik" and Elmer's "Poster Tack". Plasti-Tak by Brooks Manufacturing Company appears to pre-date Blu Tack, with a trademark registration in 1964.

Versions of the product are also sold under the generic names "adhesive putty" and "mounting putty". The generic trademark or common name for mounting putty varies by region.

Alternative uses 
Like all poster putties, Blu Tack provides an alternative to the artist's traditional kneaded eraser.

Blu Tack was often used with the Sinclair ZX81 microcomputer to help mitigate crashes caused by wobbly external RAM packs. This was such a widespread problem that Sinclair Research's technical support department officially recommended the use of Blu Tack to resolve this issue.

In 2007 the artist Elizabeth Thompson created a  sculpture of a house spider using Blu Tack over a wire frame. It was exhibited at London Zoo.

Blu Tack can be used as a damping agent for sound and vibration applications, due to its low amplitude response properties. A 2013 study concluded that the substance is a comfortable alternative to over-the-counter ear plugs for the attenuation of everyday sound.

The New Zealand Government Earthquake Commission recommends that products such as Blu Tack should be used to prevent ornaments and small household items from falling or moving in the event of an earthquake.

Blu Tack is sometimes used by electronic hobbyists to hold through-hole electronic components in position for soldering onto PC-boards.

See also 
 Glue stick

References

External links 

 Official Blu-Tack site, UK
 Official Blu Tack site, Australia
 Letter regarding development of a similar precursor product, from sealant developer Alan Holloway to James Ward, author of Adventures in Stationery, on discussion page

Adhesives
TotalEnergies
Brand name materials